Holman is an extinct town in Webster County, in the U.S. state of Missouri. The GNIS classifies it as a populated place.

A post office called Holman was established in 1903, and remained in operation until 1911. The community once had Holman Schoolhouse, now defunct. The school had the name of the Holman family of settlers.

References

Former populated places in Webster County, Missouri
Ghost towns in Missouri
Ghost towns on U.S. Route 66